A preselector is a name for an electronic device that connects between a radio antenna and a radio receiver. The preselector is a band-pass filter that blocks troublesome out-of-tune frequencies from passing through from the antenna into the radio receiver (or preamplifier) that otherwise would be directly connected to the antenna.

Purpose
A preselector improves the performance of nearly any receiver, but is especially helpful to receivers with broadband front-ends that are prone to overload, such as scanners and ordinary consumer-market shortwave and AM broadcast receivers.

A preselector typically is tuned to have a narrow bandwidth, centered on the receiver's operating frequency. The preselector passes through the signal on the frequency it is tuned to unchanged (or only slightly diminished) but it reduces or removes off-frequency signals, cutting down or eliminating unwanted interference.

Extra filtering can be useful because the first input stage ("front end") of receivers contains at least one RF amplifier, which has power limits ("dynamic range"). Most radios' front ends amplify all radio frequencies delivered to the antenna connection. So off-frequency signals constitute a load on the RF amplifier, wasting part of its dynamic range on unwanted signals. "Limited dynamic range" means that the amplifier circuits have a limit to the total amount of incoming RF signal they can amplify without overloading, symptoms of which are nonlinearity ("distortion") and ultimately clipping ("buzz").

When the front-end overloads, the performance of the receiver is severely reduced, and in extreme cases can damage the receiver. In situations with noisy and crowded bands, or where there are strong local stations, the dynamic range of the receiver can quickly be exceeded. Extra filtering by the preselector limits frequency range and power demands that are applied to all later stages of the receiver, only loading it with signals within the preselected band.

Multifunction preselectors
A preselector can be engineered so that in addition to attenuating interference from unwanted frequencies, it will perform other services which may be helpful for a receiver: It can limit input signal voltage to protect a sensitive receiver from damage caused by static discharge, nearby voltage spikes, and overload from nearby transmitters' signals; it can provide a DC path to ground, to drain off noisy static charge from building up on the antenna; it can also incorporate a small radio frequency amplifier stage to boost the filtered signal. None of these extra conveniences are necessary for the function of preselection, and in particular, for typical use an amplifier in the preselector serves no helpful purpose.

Antenna preamplifiers (preamps) can be made "tunable" by incorporating a front-end preselector circuit to improve their performance. The integrated device is both a preamplifier and a preselector, and either name is correct. This ambiguity sometimes leads to confusion – conflating preselection with amplification.

A regular, ordinary preselector is sometimes called a "passive" preselector to emphasize that it has no internal amplifier and requires no power supply. Ordinary "passive" preselectors typically work well with modern receivers, with no noticeable signal-loss.

Preselect filter bank 
Spectrum analyzers and some wideband software-defined radio receivers incorporate a bank of switchable preselectors to reject out-of-band signals that could result in spurious signals at the frequencies being analyzed. In the case of software-defined radio receivers, many of which have limited dynamic range, a preselect filter bank also serves to limit strong out-of-band signals that could potentially saturate the receiver front-end.

Bandwidth vs. signal strength trade-off
With all preselectors there is some very small loss at the tuned frequency; usually, most of the loss is in the inductor (the tuning coil). Tuning the preselector for narrower bandwidth (or higher , or greater selectivity) slightly raises the loss, which nonetheless remains small.

Most preselectors have separate settings for an inductor and a capacitor (at least).
So with at least two adjustments available to tune to just one frequency, there are often a variety of possible settings that will tune the preselector to frequencies in its middle-range.

For the narrowest bandwidth (highest ), the preselector is tuned using the highest inductance and lowest capacitance for the desired frequency, but this produces the greatest loss. It also requires retuning the preselector more often while searching for faint signals, to keep the preselector's pass-through frequency adequately close to the radio's receiving frequency.

For lowest loss (and widest bandwidth), the preselector is tuned using the lowest inductance and highest capacitance (and the lowest , or least selectivity) for the desired frequency. The wider bandwidth allows more interference through from nearby frequencies, but reduces the need to retune the preselector while tuning the receiver, since any one low-inductance setting for the preselector will pass a wide span of nearby frequencies.

Different from an antenna tuner
Although a preselector is placed inbetween the radio and the antenna, in the same electrical location as a feedline matching unit, it serves a different purpose: A transmatch or "antenna tuner" connects two transmission lines with different impedances and only blocks out-of-tune frequencies incidentally (if it blocks any at all).

A transmatch matches transmitter impedance to feedline impedance, so that signal power from the radio transmitter smoothly transfers into the antenna's feed cable; a properly adjusted transmatch prevents transmitted power from being reflected back into the transmitter (backlash current). Some antenna tuner circuits can both impedance match and preselect, for example the Series Parallel Capacitor (SPC) tuner, and many 'tuned-transformer'-type matching circuits used in balanced line (BLT) tuners can be adjusted to also function as band-pass filters.

See also
 Antenna tuner
 Band-pass filter

Footnotes

References

External links
 

Radio electronics
Receiver (radio)
Wireless tuning and filtering